Candoia is a genus of non-venomous boas found mostly in New Guinea, Melanesia and the Maluku Islands in Indonesia. Common names include bevel-nosed boas and keel-scaled boas.

Description
The species of the genus Candoia typically have a rounded and heavy body, with a flattened triangular-shaped head and an upturned nose. Colors and patterns vary greatly, but most are various shades of brown to black. Males are typically smaller than females and can be distinguished by their prominent cloacal spurs.

Distribution and habitat
The species of the genus Candoia are found from Samoa and Tokelau west through Melanesia to New Guinea and the Maluku Islands in indonesia.

Behavior
All species of Candoia are primarily nocturnal.

Feeding
The primary diet of Candoia species consists of frogs and lizards.

Reproduction
In the species of the genus Candoia, breeding occurs early in the year, typically after rains. Several males will approach and pursue a single female, though, there is no combat between the males. Females seem to only ovulate once every two or three years and give birth to litters averaging 10 or so neonates. The Solomon Island ground boa (C. paulsoni) is an exception, as it is known to have particularly large litters, occasionally producing 30 or 40 small neonates.

Captivity
The species of the genus Candoia are frequently imported for the exotic pet trade, but are now being bred in captivity with some regularity by private individuals. Their small size and ease of care make them interesting captives, but wild-caught specimens are not known to acclimate well. The stress of captivity manifests itself in the form of lack of interest in food. Their natural diet often presents a problem for hobbyists mainly familiar with using rodents as food.

Species
Five species are recognized:

) Not including the nominate subspecies.T') Type species.

Classification
The genus Candoia is traditionally placed in the subfamily Boinae; however, a 2013 study comparing DNA sequences of 12 genes of over 4,000 species supported Candoia as more distantly related, with remaining members of the Boinae being more closely related to the boid subfamily Erycinae; thus Candoia was placed in the newly named subfamily Candoiinae.

References

External links

 "The Candoia Page" at Kingsnake.com. Accessed 5 July 2008.

Further reading
Gray JE (1842). "Synopsis of the species of prehensile-tailed Snakes, or Family BOIDÆ". Zoological Miscellany 2: 41-46. (Candoia, new genus, p. 43).
Smith HM, Chiszar D, Tepedelen K, van Breukelen F (2001). "A revision of the bevel-nosed boas (Candoia carinata complex) (Reptilia: Serpentes)". Hamadryad 26 (2): 283-315.

 
Reptiles of Southeast Asia
Snake genera
Taxa named by John Edward Gray
Reptiles of Oceania